Webster Park is a public park in Wauwatosa, Wisconsin. It is owned by Milwaukee County and leased to the city of Wauwatosa.

Description 
Webster Park is a 4.5 acre park that is also a part of the Oak Leaf Trail. The Menomonee River runs through the park, starting from Hampton Avenue to Capitol Drive. Webster Park has a paved trail used for biking, jogging, walking, and skating. There is an off-road mountain biking trail across the river for hikers and mountain bikers. Webster Park has a playground, a soccer field, and open space for various activities for the public.

Species 
Animal species include: white-tail deer, beaver, mourning doves, and mallards. Plant species include Purple coneflower.

Gallery

References

Parks in Milwaukee County, Wisconsin
Wauwatosa, Wisconsin